Silk events is a full-service event management agency with branches in Uganda and Rwanda.

History
The company was founded in 2005. It has since organised a number of events in Uganda including corporate events, music concerts, and branding events. It has organised events for musicians like Beenie Man,  Demarco (musician), Sisqó, Sean Paul Maurice Kirya, Grace Nakimera, and the Miss Uganda event.

References

External links 
"Event managers meet in Kampala"
"Professional events meeting coming"

Event management companies of Uganda
Kumusha